The CSX Painesville bridge is a concrete viaduct located just outside city limits in Painesville Township in northeast Ohio. The bridge was built in 1908 for the Lake Shore and Michigan Southern Railway. It has served the Lake Shore, New York Central,  Penn Central, Conrail, and its current owner CSX. An average 50 trains daily cross the span, including two Amtrak Lake Shore Limited trains, no. 48 and 49. The bridge is bracketed by two highway spans, just to the south is US Route 20 bridge and just to the north is Ohio State Route 2.

References

External links
Grand River Railroad Bridge - Painesville, Ohio (Bridgehunter)

Viaducts in the United States
Railroad bridges in Ohio
Transportation buildings and structures in Lake County, Ohio
Lake Shore and Michigan Southern Railway
Concrete bridges in the United States